Rear Admiral Martin Brian Alabaster CBE (born 10 August 1958) is a retired senior officer in the British Royal Navy.

Early life
Alabaster spent his early years in Devon, Pembrokeshire and Hampshire but for the majority of his upbringing lived in south London. There, he attended Dulwich College. He later joined the Royal Navy and entered Britannia Royal Naval College in Dartmouth, at the rank of Midshipman in January 1977. Martin completed his Naval General Training, and then went up to Queens' College, Cambridge to read Engineering.

Naval career
He later attained an MSc in Electronics at Southampton University and then became the Project Manager for Seawolf missile development. He also returned to the Britannia Royal Naval College as a Senior Divisional Officer. Whilst in the rank of Commander, he spent some time in HMS London as the Weapon Engineering Officer as well as acting as Naval Assistant to the Chief of Fleet Support.

His promotion to captain saw him in the role of Assistant Director of Combat Systems, Communications and Electronic Warfare and he became the first Director of Equipment Capability. In 2001 he became a member of the Royal College of Defence Studies. He was promoted to Commodore and spent three years in the Defence Procurement Agency in Abbey Wood as the Head of Project Management. He then spent a further two years in the Fleet Headquarters as Assistant Chief of Staff (Engineering), responsible for all aspects of engineering and safety in ships, submarines, aircraft and establishments of the Fleet Command.  He then once again returned to Britannia Royal Naval College, Dartmouth, as commander of the facility. He left this role when he was promoted in September 2008 to Flag Officer Scotland, Northern England and Northern Ireland (FOSNNI) and Flag Officer Reserves, stationed in HM Naval Base Clyde. This position made him the Royal Navy's senior officer in Scotland with representational duties everywhere north of the M4.  As Flag Officer Reserves he commands the Royal Naval and Royal Marines Reserves. He was appointed CBE on 11 June 2011. He then retired from service on 9 September 2011.

Personal life
Martin Alabaster married Moira Bain, a professional violinist and viola player, with whom he has two children, Hugh (born 1995) and Maddy (born 1997). His residence is in Bradford-on-Avon, in Wiltshire.

References

|-

1958 births
Living people
People educated at Dulwich College
Alumni of the University of Southampton
Alumni of Queens' College, Cambridge
Royal Navy rear admirals
Commanders of the Order of the British Empire
Graduates of Britannia Royal Naval College
Military personnel from Devon